The Messerschmitt KR175 microcar (1953–1955) was the first vehicle built by Messerschmitt under its 1952 agreement with Fritz Fend. In concept, although not in actual design, it was, in principle, a development of the Fend Flitzer invalid carriage. Approximately 15,000 were built before it was replaced by the Messerschmitt KR200 in 1956.

History
Messerschmitt, temporarily not allowed to manufacture aircraft, had turned its resources to producing other products. In 1952, Fend approached Messerschmitt with the idea of manufacturing small motor vehicles. These were based on his Fend Flitzer invalid carriage.

The first of Fend's vehicles to enter production at Messerschmitt's Regensburg factory was the KR175 (prototypes had been designated FK150 - Fend Kabinenroller 150 - with a 150cc  F&S engine) . The title Kabinenroller means "scooter with cabin". While the Messerschmitt name and insignia were used on the car, a separate company, incorporated as Regensburger Stahl- und Metallbau GmbH (RSM), was created to manufacture and market the vehicle.

There were several problems with the first KR175s to be built, resulting in 70 design modifications between the beginning of production in February and June 1953. The KR200, although superficially very similar was developed from the KR175 but with many fundamental changes,  replaced it in 1955.

Features

Being based on the Kabinenroller platform, the KR175 had tandem seating accessed by a hatch that opened upward and to the right. The standard version of the KR175's hatch had a canopy made from a large Plexiglas dome with a cutout at the front for a small, flat glass windshield and a cutout on either side for the frames for the sliding windows. A "sportster" model was available without the dome or the windows, with only the windshield attached. On early models, the windshield wiper was manually operated.

The front fenders did not have wheel cutouts.

Engine and transmission
The KR175 ran on a  Fichtel & Sachs air-cooled single cylinder two-stroke engine centrally positioned in front of the rear wheel, just behind the passenger's seat. The engine was started with a pull rope as standard, but there was an option of an electric starter. The electric starter became standard in 1954. The transmission was a sequential, positive-stop type with four speeds and no synchronization nor reverse gear.

Controls

The KR175 used the standard Kabinenroller steering system, with a steering bar connected directly to the track rods of the front wheels, providing an extremely direct response best suited to small, measured inputs. The KR175's steering bar was made from tubular steel. The gearshift lever, on the right side of the cockpit, had a secondary lever on it which operated the clutch. The throttle was operated by a twist-grip on the left handlebar. The foot brake pedal, which was the only pedal in the car, operated brakes on all three wheels mechanically, using cables. The handbrake lever operated similarly.

In 1954, the clutch lever was replaced by a pedal.

MI-VAL Mivalino

Italian motorcycle manufacturer Metalmeccanica Italiana Valtrompia s.p.a., makers of the brand , assembled KR175s in Brescia, Italy, using components imported from Messerschmitt but with their own  two-stroke engine installed. These cars were sold as the MI-VAL Mivalino.

Data
 Configuration: mid (rear) engine, rear drive
 Seating, front/rear: 1/1
 Weather protection: bubble canopy coupe
 Heating/air conditioning: none/none
 Engine type: Fichtel & Sachs, 1 cylinder, 2 stroke
 Displacement: 174 cc
 Bore x stroke— 62 x 58 mm
 Compression: 6.8:1
 Power:  @ 5,250 rpm
 Cooling: air, with fan
 Starter: kick starter, later Dynastart
 Drive: 4 speed and chain to single rear wheel
 Brakes: 3 wheel
 Wheel size: 4.00 by 8 in
 Dimensions (length/width/height) (m): //
 Wheelbase: 
 Track, front/rear: /0 m.
 Weight, empty/full load: /.
 Fuel consumption: 
 Top speed: 
 Years built: 1953 to 1955
 Number built: 15,000 (19,668 from another source)
 Price : DM 2,100.00

See also
Canopy door
List of motorized trikes

Notes

References

External links

Microcars
Coupés
Three-wheeled motor vehicles
First car made by manufacturer
Rear mid-engine, rear-wheel-drive vehicles
Cars introduced in 1953